Hsieh Cheng-peng and Peng Hsien-yin were the defending champions but chose to defend their title with different partners. Hsieh partnered Yang Tsung-hua and successfully defended his title. Peng partnered Yi Chu-huan but lost in the first round to Benjamin Lock and Rubin Statham.

Hsieh and Yang won the title after defeating Alexander Bublik and Alexander Pavlioutchenkov 7–6(7–5), 4–6, [10–5] in the final.

Seeds

Draw

References
 Main Draw

Jinan International Open - Men's Doubles
2018 Men's Doubles